Hyperini is a tribe of true weevils in the subfamily Hyperinae.

Overview of genera 

 Adonus 
 Agriochaeta 
 Alexiola 
 Asiodonus 
 Bagoides 
 Boreohypera 
 Brachypera 
 Bubalocephalus 
 Cephalalges 
 Cepurellus 
 Cepurus 
 Chloropholus 
 Coniatrichus 
 Coniatus 
 Diastrophilus 
 Donus 
 Ectomochila 
 Eremochorus 
 Eurychirus 
 Fronto 
 Frontodes 
 Geranorhinus 
 Gerynassa
 Haplopodus 
 Herpes 
 Hypera 
 Hyperites 
 Isorhinus 
 Lamprohypera 
 Larinosomus 
 Limobius 
 Lycosura 
 Macrotarrhus 
 Metadonus 
 Nothyperus 
 Oreochorus 
 Orthodonus 
 Pachypera 
 Parahypera 
 Phelypera 
 Saginesis 
 Sibirodonus 
 Tanarus 
 Tigrinellus 
 Tylopterus 
 Xeda
 Zaslavskypera
 ?Phaeopholus

References

External links 
 
 
 
 Hyperini at insectoid.info

Polyphaga tribes
Hyperinae